The Shomali Plain, also called the Shomali Valley, is a plateau just north of Kabul, Afghanistan. It is approximately 30 km wide and 80 km long. Once, it was a fertile area, rich with water, where fruits and vegetables were cultivated, and where Kabul's residents picknicked on weekends.

The region was often battleground during the wars in Afghanistan since 1978.

Taliban rule (1996-2001)
During the rule of the Taliban (1996-2001), fighting in the Shomali Plain was relatively sparse, but the plateau was maintained as fighting frontier by Ahmad Shah Massoud and his Northern Alliance who challenged the Taliban's control over much of Afghanistan.

When the Taliban retreated from the Plain in 1997, they poisoned wells, cut down trees, and destroyed the irrigation system of what was a largely Tajik area, although there are also many Pashtuns in the area.
In 1999, the Taliban considered the region, especially towns such as Istalif with 45,000 residents, a liability and they razed such towns, destroyed farms, and forced hundreds of thousands of people from the region.

2001
In 2001, a brief battle took place on Shomali Plain between the Taliban and the Northern Alliance. The Taliban forces, fearing encirclement, demoralized by the fall of the northern cities, and under constant American air attack, retreated to the Kabul, 45 kilometres to the north, and a day later they abandoned the city.

Rebuilding since 2002 
In the 2001 Afghan War, the Northern Alliance was directed to take the Shomali Plain after it secured the supply routes from the north, and wait for an international peacekeeping force to move into Kabul. They did not wait, however, because the Taliban retreated from Kabul without a fight, leaving a security vacuum, and consequently the Northern Alliance occupied Kabul without major problems.

In the summer of 2002, the Taliban being driven from Afghanistan, villagers started to return to the Shomali Plain, starting to rebuild the agriculture and their houses.  
Late 2002, the Shomali Plain still looked mostly like a desert or destructed battleground, with hardly a bush or tree, but strewn with tank-wrecks, demolished cars, torn shipping containers, and mine fields along the main road, and was considered by the UN Mine Action Center as one of the world's most active land mine areas.

By 2004, the United Nations High Commissioner for Refugees had put in 300 water points and resettled 14,000 families.

By 2009, the Shomali Plain had become one of the relatively few prospering areas of Afghanistan.
The A76 highway, running through the Shomali Plain, is militarily necessary, had been rebuilt by 2009 and was being secured, which urgency and security did not exist elsewhere in the country.
That A76 runs from Kabul to Bagram and Charikar in Parwan Province, and then into the Hindu Kush mountains to the Salang Tunnel. The tunnel provides the only year-round, all-weather access to the north of Afghanistan.

References

Landforms of Afghanistan
Plateaus of Asia